Robert Ya Fu Lee (1913 – 1 December 1986) was a Chinese actor based in the United Kingdom.

Background
Born in Tianjin, he arrived in England as an international student, attaining a BA in history from Trinity College, Cambridge. He then worked at a Chinese restaurant and a Japanese restaurant before being encouraged by friends to become an actor. Lee played supporting roles in many films and television programmes throughout the 1960s, 1970s and 1980s, and was frequently called upon whenever a production required an East Asian character. His film appearances include You Only Live Twice (1967) and Half Moon Street (1986), and his television appearances include The Avengers, The Chinese Detective and The Bill, but his best known role is as Tarō Nagazumi, the Japanese business executive and English language student, in the sitcom Mind Your Language from 1977 to 1979. He never married, citing marriage in a 1984 interview as "Too much responsibility", and lived in a flat in Hampstead, north London, where he died after two years of ill health on 1 December 1986, aged 73.

TV and filmography

References

External links
 

1913 births
1986 deaths
British male film actors
British male television actors
Alumni of Trinity College, Cambridge
Chinese emigrants to the United Kingdom
Male actors from Tianjin
Chinese male film actors
Chinese male television actors
20th-century Chinese male actors
20th-century British male actors